Yezin Agricultural University (YAU), located in Yezin, is the only institution of higher learning in agriculture in Myanmar. YAU also has major campuses in Mawlamyine and Hlegu, as well as five smaller regional campuses in Aungpan, Hmawbi, Kyaukse, Magway and Phyu. The Ministry of Agriculture, Livestock and Irrigation administered university offers primarily a four-year Bachelor of Agricultural Science (BAgrSc) program in addition to small master's and doctorate programs. Starting from the 2009 academic year, third-year and fourth-year undergraduate students have to select one crop as a specialized subject and study off campus at one of seven designated farms of the Myanmar Agricultural Service.
YAU produces more than 200 graduates both for bachelor and postgraduates each year. The university has already produced more than 9000 bachelor's degree holders together with numbers of postgraduate degrees up to 2012.

History
Agricultural education at the college level in Myanmar began in 1924 with the establishment of the Agricultural College and Research Institute of Mandalay, offering a 3-year diploma course. In 1938, the college became a constituent college of Rangoon University. Students who had passed the Intermediate of Science examination of the Rangoon University were admitted to the agricultural course and were conferred BSc (Agriculture) degree after a two-year period of study. In 1947, the college was upgraded to the Faculty of Agriculture in Mandalay under the administration of Rangoon University. The two-year agricultural course was extended to a three-year course in 1955 and BSc (Sericulture) degree was also awarded in that year. The Faculty of Agriculture was further upgraded to a separate university known as the Institute of Agriculture in 1964.

An expansion program moved the institute from Mandalay to Yezin in 1973 with the aim of training more students and providing more practical experience. In 1993 it was transferred from the Higher Education Department of the Ministry of Education to the Ministry of Agriculture and Irrigation. It was renamed Yezin Agricultural University in 1998.

The university began a master's degree program in 1978 and a doctorate degree program in 2001.

Admissions
YAU accepts only 250 first-year undergraduate students a year. Admission criteria to YAU were based primary on college matriculation exam marks and Burmese citizenship until 2006. Since 2006, the admission criteria have been based on the entrance examination administered by the university. High school graduates have to take the entrance examination in English and biology, and pass an interview. The school accepts additional 30 third-year students from a pool of top students with a Diploma in Agriculture from one of State Agricultural Institutes.

Programs
YAU offers a five-year Bachelor of Agricultural Science (BAgrSc) degree program, a three-year Master of Agricultural Science (MAgrSc) degree program, and a doctorate (PhD) program.

Bachelor's degree (B.Agr.Sc.)

Post-Graduate Degree (M.Agr.Sc., Ph.D., M.Phil.)

Post-Graduate Diplomas

Starting from the 2009 academic year, third-year and fourth-year undergraduate students have to select one crop as a specialized subject and study off-campus at one of seven designated farms of the Myanmar Agricultural Service. The aim is to "expose students to their specialized crop and do more research in order to become crop specialists". The farms growing the specialized crops are paddy in Hmawbi in Yangon Region; maize and cereals in Aungban in Shan State; pulse and oil crops in Magway in Magway Region; cotton in Nangyaw in Mandalay Region; sugarcane in Nyaungbintha in Bago Region; perennial crops in Hpa Auk in Mon State, and horticultural crops in Hlegu in Yangon Region. Fourth-year students must take one elective course in agronomy, agricultural botany, agricultural chemistry, entomology, plant pathology, horticulture and agricultural economics. Each class typically has 27 students who were chosen based on their second-year examination marks.

Faculty and administration
YAU is administered by the Ministry of Agriculture of Myanmar. In 2005, YAU maintained a staff of 600 including a 140 academic staff of whom 75 per cent have received training overseas.

The university comprises nine major academic departments and four supporting academic departments.

Main departments

Supporting departments

Timeline of YAU
The agricultural education at the college level in the Union of Myanmar was started on December 22, 1924 with the establishment of the Agricultural College and Research Institute of Mandalay. The college offered a 3-year diploma program. The college was closed from 1933 to 1937 due to the Great Depression.

In 1938, the college became a constituent college of the University of Rangoon. Students who had passed the Intermediate of Science examination of the Rangoon University were admitted to the agricultural course and were conferred a B.Sc. (Agriculture) degree after two years of study. The college was closed from 1942 to 1945 due to the Second World War. After the war, temporary arrangements were made for the second year agricultural students to continue their studies at Mahling Farm for the academic year 1945–46.

In 1947, the college was transformed to the status of Faculty of Agriculture in Mandalay under the administration of the University of Rangoon. The two-year agricultural course was extended to three-year course in 1955 and B.Sc. (Sericulture) degree was also awarded in that year.

The Intermediate College of Mandalay became a separate university in 1958, and the Faculty of Agriculture was placed under the University of Mandalay.

The Faculty of Agriculture was upgraded to the separate university known as the Institute of Agriculture. Due to the expansion program, the Institute was relocated from Mandalay to Yezin in 1973. It began offering master's degree programs in 1978.

The Yezin Agricultural University was transferred from the Higher Education Department, Ministry of Education to the Ministry of Agriculture and Irrigation on 1 September 1993. In 1998, the Institute of Agriculture was renamed as Yezin Agricultural University. It began offering Ph.D. courses in November 2001. In 2019, Yezin Agricultural University opened a facility to study Israeli techniques for agriculture and water management.

Timeline of YAU

Principals and Rectors
Mandalay (1924 - 1980)

Rectors
'''Yezin (1973–Present)

Administrative Organization
The supervision of the YAU and its policies and affairs are carried out by the Administrative and Academic Body of the University. All actions of these bodies are subject to the final approval by the Ministry of Agriculture, Livestock and Irrigation, the Ministry of Education, the Central Academic Council, the Central Administrative Council of the Universities, and Colleges of the Republic of the Union of Myanmar. The University affairs are administered by the Rector and two Pro-Rectors with the assistance of the Academic Body and Administrative Body of the University. The professional staff members of the university consist of one Rector and two Pro-rectors with the academic and administrative staff of over 600 supporting team. The affairs of YAU's outreached campuses are administered by the Principals under the control of Rector and Pro-rectors of YAU.

Campus Facilities and Associations

In Yezin Agricultural University, residential facilities are provided for all students for their safe, clean, comfortable and affordable living environment. Yezin Campus has 9 hostels with 1014 rooms, housing over 2000 students. Students can reach to any buildings including their class rooms by walking.

Each dormitory is equipped with wireless Internet access. Residents in the hostels are required to cooperate with each other to maintain their surroundings. YAU hostels have certain rules that all resident should comply with, and the residents will be held responsible for any violation of rules.

YAU has a total area of 360 acres. There are varieties of centers and associations of common interest for the students coming from all over the country. The university is not only the center of science and technology but also the place which helps students preserving their cultures and polishing their gifts and talents, and promoting their social status. Literature and Culture Subcommittees of the National Races, Fine Arts Association, Religious Association, Regional Families, English Speaking Club, Agronomy Society, Floriculture Association, Soil Science Association, Yezin Agricultural University Information Technology Association, and Sports and Gymnastics Club are some of them.

List of YAU Campuses

References

Universities and colleges in Yezin
Universities and colleges in Mandalay Region
Universities and colleges in Myanmar
Agricultural organisations based in Myanmar